The 1968 NBA Expansion Draft was the fourth expansion draft of the National Basketball Association (NBA). The draft was held on May 6, 1968, so that the newly founded Milwaukee Bucks and Phoenix Suns could acquire players for the upcoming 1968–69 season. Milwaukee and Phoenix had been awarded the expansion teams on January 22, 1968. In an NBA expansion draft, new NBA teams are allowed to acquire players from the previously established teams in the league. Not all players on a given team are available during an expansion draft, since each team can protect a certain number of players from being selected. In this draft, each of the twelve other NBA teams had protected seven players from their roster. After each round, where each the Suns and the Bucks had selected one player, the existing teams added another player to their protected list. The draft continued until both teams had selected eighteen unprotected players each, while the existing teams had lost three players each.

The Milwaukee Bucks were formed and owned by a group of investors headed by Wesley Pavalon and Marvin Fishman, which called the Milwaukee Professional Sports and Services, Inc. (Milwaukee Pro). The Bucks were the second NBA team from Milwaukee, after the Milwaukee Hawks, which moved to St. Louis in 1955 and then Atlanta in 1968, becoming the Atlanta Hawks. The Bucks' selections included former first overall pick Fred Hetzel, six-time All-Star Larry Costello, five-time All-Star Wayne Embry, four-time All-Star Guy Rodgers and one-time All-Star Len Chappell. Prior to the expansion draft, Costello retired from playing due to injury and was named as the franchise's first head coach. Ten players from the expansion draft joined the Bucks for their inaugural season, but only three played more than one season for the team. Jon McGlocklin, who played eight seasons with the Bucks, was named to the 1969 All-Star Game, becoming the franchise's first All-Star. Embry was later inducted to the Basketball Hall of Fame as a contributor.

The Phoenix Suns were formed and owned by a group of investors headed by Richard Bloch. Former Chicago Bulls head coach and  Coach of the Year Johnny Kerr was named as the franchise's first head coach. The Suns' selections included former territorial picks Gail Goodrich and George Wilson. Eight players from the expansion draft joined the Suns for their inaugural season, but only five played more than one season for the team. John Wetzel was the ninth player from the expansion draft to play for the Suns. He made his first appearance in  after serving in the military for two years. Goodrich and Dick Van Arsdale were named to the 1969 All-Star Game, becoming the franchise's first All-Stars. Van Arsdale played nine seasons with the Suns and became the Suns' franchise leader in games played when he retired in 1977, a record which has since been broken by Alvan Adams and Walter Davis. Goodrich played two seasons with the Suns and was later inducted to the Naismith Memorial Basketball Hall of Fame as a player.

Key

Selections

Notes
 Number of years played in the NBA prior to the draft
 Career with the expansion franchise that drafted the player
 Never played a game for the franchise

References
General

Specific

External links
NBA.com
NBA.com: NBA Draft History

Expansion
Milwaukee Bucks lists
Phoenix Suns lists
National Basketball Association expansion draft
National Basketball Association lists
NBA expansion draft